Kennett  may refer to:

Places

Settlements
 Kennett, California
 Kennett, Cambridgeshire, England
 Kennett, Missouri
 Kennett River, Victoria, town in Australia
 Kennett Township, Chester County, Pennsylvania
 West Kennett and East Kennett, villages in Wiltshire, England

Mountains
 Mount Kennett, mountain in Antarctica
 Kennett Ridge, ridge in Antarctica

Rivers
 Kennett River (disambiguation)
 River Kennett, Suffolk and Cambridgeshire, England

Other locations
 Kennett Square, Pennsylvania, a borough
 Kennett Memorial Airport, Missouri
 Old Kennett Meetinghouse, Kennett Township, Pennsylvania

People 
 Kennett (surname)

Other uses
 Kennett High School (disambiguation)
 Bryan v. Kennett, court case

See also
 Kennet (disambiguation)